Dahongmen station is a station on Line 10 of the Beijing Subway.

The Line 10 station opened on December 30, 2012.

Currently, Line 8 trains pass through the station without stopping here. The station for Line 8 is expected to open in late 2024.

Station Layout 
The line 10 and unopened line 8 station has underground island platforms.

Exits 
There are 4 exits, lettered A1, A2, C, and D. Exits A1 and C are accessible.

References

Railway stations in China opened in 2012
Beijing Subway stations in Fengtai District